The European Parliament election of 2009 took place on 6–7 June 2009.

The People of Freedom was largest party in Sicily with 36.4%, largely ahead of the Democratic Party (21.9%), the Movement for the Autonomies (15.6%), that ran in list within The Autonomy coalition, and the Union of the Centre (11.9%).

Results
Source: Ministry of the Interior

2009 elections in Italy
Elections in Sicily
European Parliament elections in Italy
2009 European Parliament election
June 2009 events in Europe